Chiarelli is an Italian surname and may refer to:

Bernard Chiarelli, French footballer
Bob Chiarelli, Canadian politician
Charly Chiarelli, Canadian writer
Gina Chiarelli, Canadian actress
Luigi Chiarelli (1880–1947), Italian playwright, theatre critic, and writer of short stories
Peter Chiarelli (disambiguation), two people
Raffaele Chiarelli, Belgian footballer
Rick Chiarelli, Canadian politician
Rita Chiarelli, Canadian singer
Rob Chiarelli, American record producer
Talia Chiarelli, Canadian gymnast

Italian-language surnames